Lagar Velho 1, also known as the Lagar Velho boy or Lapedo child, is a complete prehistorical skeleton found in Portugal, believed to be a hybrid that had a Neanderthal parent and an anatomically modern human parent.

In 1998, this discovery of an early Upper Paleolithic human burial at Abrigo do Lagar Velho, by the team led by pre-history archeologist João Zilhão, provided evidence of early modern humans from the west of the Iberian Peninsula. The remains, the largely complete skeleton of an approximately 4-year-old child, buried with pierced shell and red ochre, is dated to ca. 24,500 years BP. The cranium, mandible, dentition, and postcrania present a mosaic of European early modern human and Neanderthal features.

This (morphological) mosaic indicates admixture between late archaic and early modern humans in Iberia, refuting hypotheses of complete replacement of the Neanderthals by early modern humans and underlining the complexities of the cultural and biological processes and events that were involved in modern human emergence.

This was contested by several scientists including Prof. Dr. C.P.E. Zollikofer of the University of Zurich who concluded the skeleton does not reveal Neanderthal affinities.  However, genetic work from a decade later have shown that there has indeed been instances of admixture between Neanderthals and modern humans, bringing the hybrid hypothesis back within the realm of the possible.

A replica of the skeleton and a reconstruction of the boy's face, made by American anthropologist Brian Pierson, can be seen in the Interpretation Centre of the Lagar Velho. There are plans to build a museum of archeology at the Convent of St. Augustine, in the city of Leiria, which houses the original skeleton.

References

External links 
Article in Athena Review (from Wayback Machine). Accessed on June 21, 2009.
Computerized reconstruction and geometric-morphometric analysis of the Lagar Velho child skeleton. Accessed on June 21, 2009.
Paper detailing the 3d reconstruction of the skeleton

1998 archaeological discoveries
Archaeology of Portugal
Homo fossils
Ethnography
Leiria